Lukas Mühl (born 27 January 1997 in Zwiesel) is a German professional footballer who plays as a centre back for Bundesliga club FK Austria Wien.

International career
Mühl was a youth international for Germany at the U20 level.

References

External links
 
 

1997 births
Living people
People from Regen (district)
Sportspeople from Lower Bavaria
Association football defenders
German footballers
Germany youth international footballers
1. FC Nürnberg players
FK Austria Wien players
Bundesliga players
2. Bundesliga players
Footballers from Bavaria